Alan Campbell Don  (3 January 1885 – 3 May 1966) was a trustee of the National Portrait Gallery, editor of the Scottish Episcopal Church's 1929 Scottish Prayer Book, chaplain and secretary to Cosmo Lang, Archbishop of Canterbury, from 1931 to 1941, Chaplain to the Speaker of the House of Commons from 1936 to 1946 and Dean of Westminster from 1946 to 1959.

Early life and ordained ministry 
Born into a manufacturing Dundee family, the son of Robert Bogle Don and Lucy Flora Campbell, he was educated at Rugby and Magdalen College, Oxford. Deciding the family business was not for him, studied for ordination at Cuddesdon College before becoming a curate in Redcar followed by an incumbency in Yorkshire.

There then followed a 10-year period as provost of St. Paul's Scottish Episcopal (Anglican) Cathedral in his native city. In 1927 he commissioned Dundee architect Patrick Thoms to design his house.

From 1931 until 1941 he was secretary to Cosmo Gordon Lang and became a chaplain to King George V. Already the Speaker's chaplain in 1941 he became a canon of Westminster Abbey as rector of St. Margaret's, Westminster, commonly called "the parish church of the House of Commons".     His brother was Air Vice Marshal Francis Don.

Dean of Westminster 
This was followed in 1946  by elevation to the post of Dean of Westminster, a post he was to hold for 13 years, a period which included the Queen's Coronation  One other event in his time as Dean was the theft of the Stone of Scone just prior to the Coronation. As a Scot, Don felt this theft acutely and was important to the return of the Coronation Stone to Westminster.

Retirement 
He retired to Canterbury where, although he was married, he and his wife met only once a week for lunch. He died on 3 May 1966.

Arms

Notes

References 

20th-century Scottish Episcopalian priests
1885 births
People educated at Rugby School
Alumni of Magdalen College, Oxford
Deans of Westminster
1966 deaths
Honorary Chaplains to the Queen
Canons of Westminster
Provosts of St Paul's Cathedral, Dundee
Place of death missing
People from Dundee